Brissopsis elongata is a species of sea urchins of the family Brissidae. Their armour is covered with spines. Brissopsis elongata was first scientifically described in 1907 by Ole Theodor Jensen Mortensen.

References 

Animals described in 1907
elongata
Taxa named by Ole Theodor Jensen Mortensen